John Herbert Claiborne (March 16, 1828 – 1905) was a prominent Virginia politician and a leading medical administrator commanding a series of hospitals serving wounded Confederate soldiers during the American Civil War.

Born in 1828 in Virginia, Claiborne completed his medical studies in Philadelphia in 1851. That same year, he established a practice in Petersburg and served later as a House of Delegates representative and senator in the Virginia state government.

In 1862, Claiborne was ordered to establish a hospital in Petersburg for treatment of wounded soldiers and was made surgeon in charge in local Confederate forces. By the time of the Siege of Petersburg, he was the executive officer in charge of all military hospitals in Petersburg. The system in the city included seven hospitals at first, but by the time of the siege, they were consolidated into two buildings on the western side of Petersburg to avoid the shelling from the east.

Claiborne's first wife, Sara Joseph Alston, died shortly after the war. He remarried and raised another family with his second wife, Annie Leslie Watson. He continued to practice in Petersburg and died in 1905. He was the grandfather of Robert Claiborne and Clara Claiborne Park and the great-grandfather of Paul Park.

References
This article was based on the National Park Service's article on John Claiborne, which, as a creation of a branch of the US Government, is presumed to be in the public domain.

1828 births
1905 deaths
Confederate States Army surgeons
Physicians from Virginia
Politicians from Petersburg, Virginia
Members of the Virginia House of Delegates
Virginia state senators
19th-century American politicians
19th-century American physicians